Raúl Modesto Castro Ruz (born 3 June 1931) is a retired Cuban politician and general who served as the first secretary of the Communist Party of Cuba, the most senior position in the one-party communist state, from 2011 to 2021, and President of Cuba between 2008 and 2018, succeeding his brother Fidel Castro.

One of the military leaders of the Cuban Revolution, Castro served as the minister of the Armed Forces from 1959 to 2008. His ministerial tenure made him the longest-serving minister of the armed forces. Castro was also a member of the Politburo of the Communist Party of Cuba, the highest decision-making body, from 1965 until 2021. 

Because of his brother's illness, Castro became the acting president of the Council of State in a temporary transfer of power from 31 July 2006. Castro was officially made president by the National Assembly on 24 February 2008, after his brother, who was still ailing, announced on 19 February 2008 that he would not stand again. He was re-elected president on 24 February 2013. Shortly thereafter, Castro announced that his second term would be his final term, and that he would not seek re-election in 2018. He stepped down from the presidency on 19 April 2018 after his successor, Miguel Díaz-Canel was elected by the National Assembly following parliamentary elections. Castro remained the first secretary of the Communist Party; he was still considered the de facto leader of the country, retaining oversight over the president. Castro announced at the Eighth Congress of the Communist Party of Cuba, which began on 16 April 2021, that he was retiring. His successor, Miguel Díaz-Canel, was voted in on 19 April.

Castro was also the head of the constitutional reform commission, and continues to have a seat representing Santiago de Cuba's Segundo Frente municipality in the National Assembly.

Early life 
Raúl Modesto Castro Ruz was born in Birán, Cuba, the legal son of a Spanish immigrant father, Ángel Castro who was 55 at the time of his birth, and a Cuban-born mother of Canarian parentage, Lina Ruz. Raúl is the youngest of three brothers: Ramón, Fidel, and himself. He also has four sisters: Angela, Juanita, Emma, and Agustina. Ángel Castro's first wife, Maria Argota, also raised five legal half-siblings of Raúl: Pedro Emilio, Maria Lidia, Manuel, Antonia, and Georgina. 

As children, the Castro brothers were expelled from the first school they attended. Like Fidel, Raúl later attended the Jesuit School of Colegio Dolores in Santiago and Belen Jesuit Preparatory School in Havana. Raúl as an undergraduate studied social sciences. Whereas Fidel excelled as a student, Raúl turned in mostly mediocre performances. Raúl became a committed socialist and joined the Socialist Youth, an affiliate of the Soviet-oriented Cuban Communist Party, Partido Socialista Popular (PSP).
The brothers participated actively in sometimes violent student actions.

In 1953, Raúl served as a member of the 26th of July Movement group that attacked the Moncada Barracks; he received a 13-year prison sentence and spent 22 months in prison as a result of this action. During his subsequent exile in Mexico, he participated in the preparations for the expedition of the boat Granma to Cuba.

Commander in the Cuban Revolution 

When the Granma landing failed and the 82 expeditionaries were detected by government troops soon after, Raúl was one of only 12 fighters who managed to reach a safe haven in the Sierra Maestra mountains, forming the core of the nascent rebel army (see the Cuban Revolution). As Fidel's brother and trusted right-hand man, and given his proven leadership abilities during and after the Moncada attack, he was given progressively bigger commands. On 27 February 1958 Raúl was made comandante and assigned the mission to cross the old province of Oriente leading a column of guerrillas to open, to the northeast of that territory, the "Frank País Eastern Front".

As a result of Raúl's "Eastern Front" operations, he was not involved in the pivotal Operation Verano (which came close to destroying the main body of fighters but ended up a spectacular victory for Fidel), but Raúl's forces remained active and grew over time.

On 26 June 1958, Raúl Castro's rebels kidnapped ten Americans and two Canadians from the property of Moa Bay Mining Company (an American company) on the north coast of Oriente Province. The next day rebels took hostage 24 U.S. servicemen on leave from the United States naval base at Guantanamo Bay. This incident brought total kidnapped hostages to 36 (34 U.S. and 2 Canadian citizens).U.S. Ambassador Earl E. T. Smith and his staff determined the kidnappings had the following objectives: Obtain worldwide publicity, regain M-26-7 prestige lost by general strike call failure, force Batista's Air Force to stop bombing rebel holds, and gain public recognition from the U.S. Two tactical objectives the kidnapping achieved for Castro forces can be discerned from contemporaneous reporting in Time: Batista declaring a ceasefire for negotiations, forcing a reduction in Operation Verano air raids; the rebels used the lulls to regroup and fly in arms.

The hostage-taking caused significant U.S. backlash, including unfavorable public reaction, and U.S. consideration to re-establishing military support to Batista and deploying U.S. forces to free the hostages. Ultimately, the hostages were released in very small groups, extracting the maximum press attention. After their release, the hostages said they were treated well with some even claiming to support the rebel cause.

Regarding the captured Batista government soldiers, Raúl Castro notes in his war diaries: "All three were brought food and told that they would be released and only their weapons would be kept. They had money and watches we needed, but according to our principles, we didn't touch them." In the territories under guerrilla control, it created an autonomous structure by establishing hospitals, schools and several material manufacturing plants. In 1958, he was also at the origin of the M-26 intelligence services.By October 1958, after reinforcement by Fidel, the brothers had about 2,000 fighters and were operating freely throughout Oriente province. In December, while Che Guevara and Camilo Cienfuegos were operating in Santa Clara, Fidel and Raúl's army laid siege to Maffo, capturing it on 30 December. Their victorious army then headed to Santiago de Cuba, capital of Oriente province.

In response to the victory by Che Guevara at the Battle of Santa Clara, the U.S.-backed President Fulgencio Batista fled Cuba in the early morning of 1 January 1959. The two Castro brothers with their army arrived on the outskirts of Santiago de Cuba and said their forces would storm the city at 6 P.M. on 1 January if it did not first surrender. The commander (Colonel Rego Rubido) surrendered Santiago de Cuba without a fight. The war was over and Fidel was able to take power in Havana when he arrived on 8 January 1959.

Raúl's abilities as a military leader during the revolution are hard to see clearly. Unlike Che Guevara or Cienfuegos, Raúl had no significant victories he could claim credit for on his own. The last operations (which were clearly successful) were conducted with his older brother Fidel present (and in command). After Batista's fall, Raúl had the task of overseeing trials and execution of between 30 and 70 soldiers loyal to deposed president Batista who had been convicted of war crimes.

Political career

Early political career 

Raúl Castro Ruz was a member of the national leadership of the Integrated Revolutionary PO Organizations (established July 1961; dissolved March 1962) and of the United Party of the Socialist Revolution of Cuba (established March 1962; dissolved October 1965). He is also credited with helping shoot down a Lockheed U2 and killing Major Rudolf Anderson.

He served as a member of the Central Committee of the Communist Party of Cuba and Second Secretary of its Politburo from the Party's formation in October 1965; also as First Vice President of the Cuban Council of State of the National Assembly of People's Power and Council of Ministers when these were established in 1976. He was appointed Minister of the Revolutionary Armed Forces when it was founded in October 1959 and served in that capacity until February 2008.

Assumption of presidential duties 

On 31 July 2006, Fidel Castro's personal secretary, Carlos Valenciaga, announced on state-run television that Fidel Castro would provisionally hand over the duties of First Secretary of the Communist Party of Cuba (party chief), President of the Council of State of Cuba (head of state), President of the Council of Ministers of Cuba (prime minister), and Commander-in-Chief of the Armed Forces to Raúl Castro while Fidel underwent and recovered from intestinal surgery to repair gastrointestinal bleeding.

Many commentators regarded Raúl Castro as a political hardliner who would maintain the Communist Party of Cuba's influence in the country. However, others believed that he was more pragmatic than his older brother and willing to institute some market-oriented economic policies. It was speculated that he favored a variant of the current Chinese and Vietnamese political and economic model for Cuba in the hopes of preserving some elements of the socialist system.

Raúl is considered by some to be less charismatic than his brother Fidel Castro, who remained largely out of public view during the transfer-of-duty period. His few public appearances included hosting a gathering of leaders of the Non-Aligned nations in September 2006, and leading the national commemoration of the 50th anniversary of the landing of the boat Granma, which also became Fidel's belated 80th-birthday celebrations.

In a speech to university students, Raúl stated that a communist system in Cuba would remain, and that "Fidel is irreplaceable, unless we all replace him together."

On 1 May 2007 Raúl presided over the May Day celebrations in Havana. According to Granma the crowd reached over one million participants, with delegations from over 225 organizations and 52 countries.

Raúl has a reputation for his businesslike, unanimated delivery of speeches.

Communist leader 

After assuming what was originally announced as a temporary control over the presidency in 2006, on 24 February 2008 Raúl Castro won election as the new President of the Council of State and President of the Council of Ministers during a legislative session held at Cuba's Palace of Conventions in Havana. His administration subsequently announced several economic reforms. In March 2008 the government removed restrictions on the purchase of numerous products not available under Fidel Castro's administration - including DVD-players, computers, rice cookers, and microwaves. In an effort to boost food production, the government allowed private farmers and cooperatives to lease idle state-owned land and moved much of the decision-making process regarding land use from the national level to the municipal level.

All death sentences (about 30) were commuted between 2008 and 2010, although none had been executed since 2003.

In mid-2008, the government overhauled the salary structure of all state-run companies so that harder-working employees could earn higher wages. In addition, the government removed restrictions against the use of cell phones and investigated the removal of travel restrictions on Cubans.

In March 2009, Raúl Castro dismissed some officials.

In April 2011, Raúl announced a plan of 300 economic reforms encouraging private initiative, reducing state spending, encouraging foreign investment and agrarian reforms. He also announced a limitation on presidential terms, including his own.

On 24 February 2013, Cuba's parliament named Raúl Castro to a new five-year term as president and appointed Miguel Díaz-Canel as his first vice president. Castro announced that day that he would step down from power after his second term as president ended in 2018.

In 2018, he was selected as a candidate for the National Assembly of People's Power by the Segundo Frente municipality in Santiago de Cuba, regarded as the cradle of the Cuban Revolution.

Miguel Díaz-Canel took over as President of Cuba (President of the Council of State) on 19 April 2018. Raúl Castro remained First Secretary of the Central Committee of the Communist Party until he resigned on April 19, 2021.

Normalization of relations with the United States 

Raúl Castro said in a 2008 interview: "The American people are among our closest neighbors. We should respect each other. We have never held anything against the American people. Good relations would be mutually advantageous. Perhaps we cannot solve all of our problems, but we can solve a good many of them."

On 10 December 2013, Castro, in a significant move, shook hands with and greeted American President Barack Obama at the Nelson Mandela memorial service in Johannesburg.

On 17 December 2014 Castro and Obama made separate announcements to the effect that efforts to normalize relations between the two nations would begin with the re-establishment of embassies in Havana and Washington. Direct diplomatic relations had previously ceased in 1961 after Cuba became closely allied with the USSR.

Argentine-born Pope Francis facilitated the rapprochement between the U.S. and Cuba, allowing the Vatican to be used for secret negotiations. Castro and Obama made simultaneous public announcements about the progress toward normalization.

On 20 July 2015 Cuba and the United States officially resumed full diplomatic relations with the sections of "Cuban interests" in Washington, D.C., and "U.S. interests" in Havana upgraded to embassies.

On 20 March 2016 Obama made a visit to Cuba to meet with Castro - the first visit of a sitting U.S. president to Cuba in 88 years.

Speaking in 2017, Castro criticized U.S. President Donald Trump's proposition of the Mexican wall and restrictive trade policy. Castro called Trump's plans egotistical and - for the border - irrational. "You can't contain poverty, catastrophes, and migrants with walls, but with cooperation, understanding, and peace," Castro said. In November 2016 Trump (as U.S. President-elect) targeted Raúl in a tweet, saying, "If Cuba is unwilling to make a better deal for the Cuban people, the Cuban/American people and the U.S. as a whole, I will terminate deal".

Castro surprised a top American envoy in September 2017 while discussing sonic attacks on American diplomatic staff. He denied involvement but allowed FBI rare access to investigate the incident that allegedly left 21 people with hearing loss and brain damage.

In September 2019 the United States sanctioned Castro and barred him from entering the U.S. due to Cuba's support of the Nicolás Maduro government in Venezuela during the presidential crisis and alleged human-rights abuses caused by the government.

Retirement
On 16 April 2021, the 8th Congress of the Communist Party of Cuba assembled for a four-day meeting, marking the start of Castro's final transfer of leadership and retirement from politics. Miguel Dias-Canel was elected Castro's successor as First Secretary of the Communist Party on 19 April 2021.

Public and personal life 
Castro married Vilma Espín, a former Massachusetts Institute of Technology chemical engineering student and the daughter of a wealthy lawyer for the Bacardi rum company, on 26 January 1959. Vilma became president of the Cuban Federation of Women. They have three daughters (Déborah, Mariela, and Nilsa) and one son (Alejandro) Castro Espín. Vilma Espín died on 18 June 2007.

Alejandro is a Colonel in the Ministry of the Interior, as director of the office of Intelligence Coordination between MININT and MINFAR, with full oversight and access to all of the activities of the Intelligence services. Most foreign analysts consider him to be the "czar" of Cuban Intelligence and Raul's link to maintaining control over MININT, balancing it with his own control of MINFAR. He is widely viewed as Raul's most trusted advisor and is likely being prepared for a future leadership role. Their daughter Mariela Castro currently heads the Cuban National Center for Sex Education, while Déborah is married to Colonel Luis Alberto Rodríguez, head of GAESA, the Armed Forces' economic division. He is widely regarded as one of the most powerful figures in the Cuban Economy due to the Military's hold on most of the lucrative business sectors. Deborah's son, Raul Guillermo, nicknamed El Cangrejo (The Crab) due to a malformed finger, is Raul's current chief bodyguard.

In an interview in 2006, following his assumption of presidential duties, Raúl Castro commented on his public profile stating: "I am not used to making frequent appearances in public, except at times when it is required ... I have always been discreet, that is my way, and in passing I will clarify that I am thinking of continuing in that way".

In an interview with actor Sean Penn, Castro was described as "warm, open, energetic, and sharp of wit". However, Juan Reynaldo Sanchez, a defected bodyguard for Fidel who knew Raul well, wrote later that his warm public exterior was a carefully maintained façade; In private, he found him to be "rough, curt, almost unpleasant" with a dubious sense of humor. Nevertheless though, Sanchez considered Raul the true "architect" of the Castroist system, despite having a polar opposite personality to Fidel. Whereas Fidel was "charismatic, energetic, visionary but extremely impulsive and totally disorganized", Raul was described as a "natural, methodical, and uncompromising organizer".

After a meeting with Pope Francis in Vatican City on 10 May 2015, Castro said that he would conditionally consider returning to the Roman Catholic Church. He said in a televised news conference, "I read all the speeches of the pope, his commentaries, and if the pope continues this way, I will go back to praying and go back to the [Roman Catholic] church. I am not joking." The pope visited Cuba before his September 2015 visit to the United States. Castro said: "I promise to go to all his Masses and with satisfaction," when Pope Francis visited Cuba in 2015. Castro considered Christ a communist stating, "I think that's why they killed Jesus, for being a communist, for doing what Fidel defined as revolution... changing the situation."

Castro retired as Communist Party leader on 19 April 2021.

In popular culture 

In the 1969 American film Che!, Castro was played by Paul Bertoya. In the 2002 film Fidel, he was played by Maurice Comte. In the 2008 American biographical film Che, he was played by Rodrigo Santoro. 
He is mentioned as "Fidel Castro's brother" in the Billy Bragg song, Waiting For The Great Leap Forwards.

Honours and awards 

:
 Hero of the Republic of Cuba
 Order of Playa Girón
 Order of Cienfuegos

:
 Dr António Agostinho Neto Order 

:
 Order of Friendship

:
 Grand Cross of the National Order of Mali

:
 Order of the National Flag, 1st class

:
 Order of the Cross of Grunwald, 1st class

:
 Order of Friendship
 Order of the Holy Prince Daniel of Moscow, 1st class (Russian Orthodox Church)

:
 Order of Lenin 
 Order of the October Revolution 
 Jubilee Medal "In Commemoration of the 100th Anniversary of the Birth of Vladimir Ilyich Lenin" 

:
 First Class of the Order of Prince Yaroslav the Wise

:
 Grand Cordon of the Order of the Liberator

:
 Gold Star Order

References

Citations

Sources

Notes

External links 

 Raul Castro Stamps His Mark, Havana Times, 4 March 2009
 Who is Raul Castro, Cuba's new leader?,  Times Online, 19 February 2008.
 Biography by CIDOB Foundation (in Spanish)
 Speech by Raúl Castro on July 26, 2007 (English translation), Escambray Digital, 27 July 2007.

 "Cuba in transition"  in Starbroek News, 19 April 2007
 "Regime readies path for Raúl Castro's rise" by Frances Robles, Miami Herald, 14 July 2006.
 Raul Castro Books 
 BBC Profile: Raul Castro, 24 February 2008
 Time Magazine: Castro Family Values: Fidel vs. Raul 17 April 2008
 Photographs of Raul Castro, 1964 – Duke University Libraries Digital Collections
 

|-

|-

|-

|-

|-

|-

1931 births
Living people
2000s in Cuba
2010s in Cuba
20th-century Cuban politicians
21st-century Cuban politicians
Anti-Americanism
Che Guevara
Communist Party of Cuba politicians
Cuban Marxists
Cuban socialists
Cuban communists
Cuban nationalists
Cuban people of Canarian descent
Cuban people of Galician descent
Cuban revolutionaries
Raul
First Secretaries of the Communist Party of Cuba
Government ministers of Cuba
Members of the National Assembly of People's Power
People from Mayarí
People of the Cuban Revolution
Presidents pro tempore of the Community of Latin American and Caribbean States
Presidents of Cuba
Prime Ministers of Cuba
Recipients of the National Order of Mali
Recipients of the Order of Holy Prince Daniel of Moscow
Recipients of the Order of Lenin
Recipients of the Order of Prince Yaroslav the Wise, 1st class
Recipients of the Order of the Cross of Grunwald, 1st class
Grand Crosses of the Order of the Quetzal
Secretaries-General of the Non-Aligned Movement
Vice presidents of Cuba
Cuban Roman Catholics
Christian communists
Defense ministers of Cuba